"Tip Toe" is a song by American rapper and singer Roddy Ricch, featuring vocals from fellow  American rapper and singer A Boogie wit da Hoodie. The song was released on November 25, 2019, as the third single from Ricch's debut studio album Please Excuse Me for Being Antisocial. The song was written by the artists alongside producers Niaggi and Pilgrim.

Music video
A music video to accompany the release of "Tip Toe" was first released onto YouTube on November 25, 2019.

Personnel
Credits adapted from Tidal.
 Niaggi – producer
 Pilgrim – producer
 Curtis "Sircut" Bye – assistant engineer
 Zachary Acosta – assistant engineer
 Nicolas De Porcel – masterer
 Cyrus "NOIS" Taghipour – mixer
 Derek "MixedByAli" Ali – mixer
 Artist Dubose – writer
 Beck Norling – writer
 Gianni van den Brom – writer
 Rodrick Moore – vocals, writer

Charts

Certifications

References

2019 singles
2019 songs
A Boogie wit da Hoodie songs
Atlantic Records singles
Roddy Ricch songs
Songs written by Roddy Ricch
Songs written by A Boogie wit da Hoodie